Flight School is the fifth mixtape by American rapper Wiz Khalifa. It was released April 17, 2009, by Rostrum Records. The mixtape features two guest appearances from Chevy Woods (under the stage name as "Kev da Hustla") and John Record.

Track listing

Charts

References

2009 mixtape albums
Wiz Khalifa albums